Denis Lemeunier (born 12 February 1965) is a French wheelchair racer. He is best known for defeating defending champion Kevin Papworth in the 2001 London Marathon wheelchair race, a feat given that his wheelchair, which normally would take a year to break in, was only 5 weeks old. He competed in the 2004 and 2008 Summer Paralympics, taking a bronze medal in the 4×400 metre relay the latter year.

References

External links 
 
 

1965 births
Living people
French male wheelchair racers
Paralympic athletes of France
Athletes (track and field) at the 2004 Summer Paralympics
Athletes (track and field) at the 2008 Summer Paralympics
Paralympic bronze medalists for France
Athletes (track and field) at the 2012 Summer Paralympics
Paralympic wheelchair racers
Paralympic medalists in athletics (track and field)
Medalists at the 2008 Summer Paralympics